Samarium(III) bromide is a crystalline compound of one samarium and three bromine atoms with the chemical formula of SmBr3. Samarium(III) bromide is a dark brown powder at room temperature. The compound has a crystal structure isotypic to that of plutonium(III) bromide.

Preparation
SmBr3·6H2O can be crystallized by dissolving samarium oxide in 40% hydrobromic acid. The hydrate and ammonium chloride are heated in a vacuum to obtain the anhydrous form of samarium(III) bromide.

Other compounds
Samarium(III) bromide forms some compounds with hydrazine, such as SmBr3·3N2H4·H2O which is a pale yellow needle-shaped crystal that is soluble in water and ethanol but insoluble in benzene, with d20 °C = 3.147 g/cm3.

References

Bromides
Samarium compounds
Lanthanide halides